The A33 is a major road in the counties of Berkshire and Hampshire in southern England. The road currently runs in three disjoint sections.

Route

Reading–Basingstoke
The first stretch of the A33 is a relatively new road, built as the A33 relief road, which starts on the Inner Distribution Road and bypasses most of suburban Reading, servicing the Kennet Island residential development, Madejski Stadium and Green Park Business Park, towards the M4, where it connects at junction 11. The first stretch of this road follows the route of the old Coley branch railway, including a passage under the railway era bridge carrying Berkeley Avenue. A two-year redevelopment scheme ran from early 2008 until late 2010, widening the northern section of the dual carriageway and significantly expanding and improving the motorway junction.  The Mereoak Roundabout south of the motorway was replaced with two separate junctions with traffic lights.

The section south of the M4 is dual carriageway up to the county boundary with Hampshire, where it reverts to single carriageway towards Basingstoke.

Basingstoke–Winchester
The second section of the A33 starts near Popham, southwest of Basingstoke at a junction with the A30. The road from here to Winchester is a scenic mix of single and dual carriageway, that was progressively improved in the late 1960s. The route runs through much of the borough of Basingstoke and Deane. At Kings Worthy, the road diverts onto part of the original Winchester Bypass, constructed in the late 1930s, up to the A34.

Southampton
The third section of A33 starts at the Chilworth Roundabout, a junction with the A27 and M3, and runs south into the centre of Southampton and further south to Ocean Village. It then turns west and into dual carriageway at a roundabout near the Isle of Wight ferry terminal, past the docks and through Town Quay to run along West Quay Road, continuing past Leisure World and Ikea (which is partially responsible for congestion on the road and immediate surroundings due to its popularity, particularly on weekends). The A33 then bears left slightly to carry on along the Millbrook Road West dual carriageway to meet the M271 and A35 at Redbridge Flyover.

History
The A33 originally started at a junction with what was the A32 at Riseley Common and was a continuous route to Southampton Between Basingstoke and Southampton, it mostly followed the course of the historic Roman Road between these towns. This section of the route became part of the London–Southampton Trunk Road. The road was progressively detrunked as the M3 was extended.

The Winchester Bypass was constructed in the mid-1930s. While a significant improvement at the time, as other parts of the road were improved around it, it became increasingly ineffective and dangerous. The bypass was subsequently replaced by the completion of the M3 over Twyford Down, which generated a significant road protest.

References

External links
 
 A33 route on OpenStreetMap

Roads in England
Roads in Berkshire
Roads in Hampshire
Transport in Hampshire